Barbarians is a 2004 miniseries on The History Channel which tells the story of tribes from the Early Middle Ages and the Late Middle Ages. Two series have currently been produced, each consisting of four episodes – the first aired in 2004, and the second aired in 2007. The series tells about what the groups did, who they conquered, and how they fell. Clancy Brown narrated season 1 and Bob Boving narrated season 2. The 2004 miniseries was History Channel's highest-rated telecast of the year.

Episodes

Season 1 (2004) 
The Goths
The Vikings
The Mongols
The Huns

Season 2 (2007) 
The Vandals
The Saxons
The Franks
The Lombards

References

External links 
 

2004 American television series debuts
2007 American television series endings
2000s American television miniseries
History (American TV channel) original programming
2000s American documentary television series
Medieval documentaries